Michel Boujenah (born 3 November 1952) is a French-Tunisian Jewish actor, comedian, film director, and screenwriter.

Life and career
Michel Boujenah was born on 3 November 1952 in Tunis, Tunisia. He is the brother of Paul Boujenah, a film director, and the uncle of actors Matthieu Boujenah and Lucie Boujenah.

Boujenah has appeared in over thirty films as well as a variety of television productions. He has also directed the films Father and Sons (2003), Trois amis (2007), and Heartstrings (2016), and written screenplays for a number of others.

Controversy
In 2017, Boujenah's invitation to appear at a Tunisian cultural festival was protested by activists involved in the Boycott, Divestment and Sanctions movement against Israel. While Boujenah is not Israeli, he has spoken positively about Israel and said "I feel Jewish, French, Tunisian, Zionist and very close to Israel, as well as a supporter of a Palestinian state." The Tunisian Association for the Support of Minorities defended Boujenah and accused boycott promoters of antisemitism.

Selected filmography

Director
 Father and Sons (2003)
 Trois amis (2007)
 Heartstrings (2016)

Awards and nominations
 1985 – won the César Award for Best Supporting Actor for Three Men and a Cradle
 1994 – nominated for the César Award for Best Actor for Le Nombril du Monde
 2004 – nominated for the César Award for Best Debut for Father and Sons

Honours
  : Officer of the Order of Cultural Merit (2004)

References

External links

 
 

1952 births
Living people
French comedians
French male film actors
French male television actors
French film directors
French male screenwriters
French screenwriters
Writers from Tunis
Officers of the Order of Cultural Merit (Monaco)
French people of Tunisian-Jewish descent
Best Supporting Actor César Award winners
20th-century French male actors
21st-century French male actors
French Zionists
Tunisian Zionists